Arthur Luxenberg is an American attorney and partner at the Manhattan law firm Weitz & Luxenberg, which he co-founded in 1986.

References

Living people
Lawyers from New York City
Year of birth missing (living people)